Eric Grant John (born 1960) is the current Senior Advisor for Security Negotiations and Agreements and the former U.S. Ambassador to the Kingdom of Thailand, having been appointed October 22, 2007. Ambassador John joined the Foreign Service in 1983 and has served primarily in East Asia. He has three tours in Korea, most recently as the Minister Counselor for Political Affairs at the U.S. Embassy in Seoul. He also served as the Deputy Director of Korean Affairs in Washington, D.C. His other tours include Deputy Principal Officer of the U.S. Consulate General in Ho Chi Minh City, Vietnam; the Orderly Departure Program at the U.S. Embassy in Bangkok, Thailand; and the U.S. Embassy in Dar es Salaam, Tanzania. In 2005, Ambassador John was named Deputy Assistant Secretary of State for Southeast Asia.  He currently serves as the Foreign Policy Advisor to the Chief of Staff of the United States Air Force.

The ambassador grew up in New Castle, Indiana. He is married and has had a son and daughter. On August 27, 2010, his daughter Nicole fell to her death in NYC from a window ledge. She was aged 17.

Education
Ambassador John earned a B.S. in Foreign Service from the Georgetown University School of Foreign Service in 1982, and an M.A. in National Security Studies from the National War College in 2002.

Languages
Ambassador John learned Portuguese in Brazil as a high school exchange student with AFS Intercultural Programs. He can speak Korean, Vietnamese and Thai.

References

External links

Bangkok Embassy U.S. Department of State

1960 births
Living people
People from Indiana
Walsh School of Foreign Service alumni
United States Foreign Service personnel
National War College alumni
Ambassadors of the United States to Thailand